Amorbaea hepatica is a moth in the family Xyloryctidae. It was described by Edward Meyrick in 1908. It is found in India.

The wingspan is 22–26 mm. The forewings are purple-brownish ochreous, more purplish towards the base and with the costal edge finely yellowish. The hindwings are ochreous yellowish, with a slight fuscous tinge.

References

Xyloryctidae
Moths described in 1908
Moths of Asia